Bay of Plenty is a New Zealand electoral division returning one member to the New Zealand House of Representatives. He replaced Tony Ryall, also of the National Party, who retired after representing the seat since .

Population centres
In the 1892 electoral redistribution, population shift to the North Island required the transfer of one seat from the South Island to the north. The resulting ripple effect saw every electorate established in 1890 have its boundaries altered, and eight electorates were established for the first time, including Bay of Plenty.

Bay of Plenty was created for the change to the mixed-member proportional (MMP) representation voting system; it was carved out of parts of the old seats of Kaimai, Tarawera and Eastern Bay of Plenty.  Its original incarnation was based mostly around Whakatane and Opotiki districts, with the remaining population coming from Te Puke and parts of greater Tauranga. The current Bay of Plenty electorate is wrapped around Tauranga city, but does not include the city. Up until the 2019–20 review, it included Matakana Island.

Prior to the 2007 boundary review, it did not extend to the western side of Tauranga or to Matakana Island. Instead it comprised a section of the central Bay of Plenty coast, from the eastern periphery of the Tauranga urban area to outside the main populated part of Whakatane. It included the towns of Te Puke, Edgecumbe and Papamoa. Rapid population growth around Tauranga has driven considerable boundary change at each review.  For the 2008 election, the eastern boundary moved far westwards to the eastern fringe of Te Puke, in the process abandoning sections of the central coast to the Rotorua and East Coast seats.

History 
The upper central North Island is an area where New Zealand First has done well, frequently getting a higher vote share in seats in both the Bay of Plenty region and in the Waikato than it does nationally.

The earlier Bay of Plenty electorate from 1893 to 1978 was held by William Kelly 1893–1896, William Herries 1896–1908, William MacDonald 1908–1920, Kenneth Williams 1920–1935, Gordon Hultquist 1935–1941, Bill Sullivan 1941–1957, Percy Allen 1957–1975 and Duncan MacIntyre 1975–1978. Williams had the distinction of being returned unopposed in three general elections, 1922, 1925 and 1931; in 1928 he was opposed by Alexander Moncur for Labour.

Members of Parliament
Unless otherwise stated, all MPs terms began and ended at general elections.

Key

1 Died in office 
2 Died of illness while on military service 
3 Resigned during term

List MPs
Members of Parliament elected from party lists in elections where that person also unsuccessfully contested the Bay of Plenty electorate. Unless otherwise stated, all MPs terms began and ended at general elections.

Election results

2020 election

2017 election

2014 election

2011 election

Electorate (as at 26 November 2011): 46,546

2008 election

2005 election

2002 election

1999 election

1996 election

1957 by-election

1941 by-election

1938 election

1935 election

1928 election

1920 by-election

1919 election

1914 election

1911 election

1908 election

 
 
 
 
 
 
|-
|style="background-color:#E9E9E9" ! colspan="6" style="text-align:left;" |'''Second ballot result
|-

1905 election

1902 election

1899 election

1896 election

1893 election

Notes

References

Bibliography

External links 
 Holders of Bay of Plenty seat, from 1893 to 1941
 Electorate profile, current
 Electorate profile, 2005. Parliamentary Library

New Zealand electorates
Politics of the Bay of Plenty Region
1893 establishments in New Zealand
1996 establishments in New Zealand
1978 disestablishments in New Zealand